Lasani Express is a passenger train named after Sufi saint Peer Syed Jama'at Ali Shah-e-Lasani of Ali Pur Sayyedan Sharif Narrowal, operated daily by Pakistan Railways between Lahore and Sialkot.

Route
 Lahore Junction–Shahdara Bagh Junction via Karachi–Peshawar Railway Line
 Shahdara Bagh Junction–Narowal Junction via Shahdara Bagh–Chak Amru Branch Line
 Narowal Junction–Sialkot Junction via Wazirabad–Narowal Branch Line

Station stops

Equipment
The train offers economy accommodations.

Incidents
On 14 June 2016, the engine of the Lahore bound Lasani Express (126 Down) broke down near Baddomalhi railway station near Pasrur. Passengers and crew had to wait up to 8 hours before an alternate engine was provided.

References

Named passenger trains of Pakistan
Passenger trains in Pakistan